Minhaj al-Karamah fi Ma'rifat al-imamah ("The Miraculous Way of Knowledge of the Imamate"), also known as Minhāj al-Istikāmah fī Isbātu al-Imamah, is a theological treatise written by a prominent Shia scholar Allamah Al-Hilli. Al-Hilli wrote his book for the sake of defending the Imamah.

Author 
Abu Mansur Jamal Addin Hasan Ibn Yousef Ibn Motahhar, also known as Allameh Al-Hilli, was a theologian. He is best known for his writings on Islamic jurisprudence and Islamic theology.

Importance 
The Minhaj al-karamah fi macrifat al-imamah of Ibn al-Mutahhar al-Hilli, which was written for, or at the request of, the Ilkhan Uljaytu, is a statement of the Imami Shi'a doctrine of the Imamate and a refutation of the Sunni doctrine of the caliphate. Ibn Taymiyyah later wrote a rejection on the book of Allama Hilli Minhaj as-Sunnah an-Nabawiyyah. In turn, some other books were written later, refuting the claims of Minhaj al-sunnah such as the Ikmal Al-Mennah, and the Minhaj Al-Shariah.

Commentary 
This book has a commentary by "Sayyed Ali Hoseini Milani" in Arabic.  It is made up of three volumes.

Content 
This book includes six parts. In the first part "Allameh Hilli Arises", there are discourses about Imamate. He explains his reasons for defending and believing in Imamate. In part three, he refers to some reasons about Imam Ali's leadership. In the fourth part, he mentions three proofs for Ali's Imamate. In the fifth part, he refers to reasons for rejecting who knows himself as Imam before Ali. He finally rejects the reasons mentioned in proving Abu Bakr succession.

References

Further reading 
 

Shia literature
Religious books